Nikolai Karl Paul von Bunge (tr.), more commonly known as Nikolai Bunge, was the German-Russian preeminent architect of Russian capitalism under Alexander III. He was a distinguished economist, statesman, and academician of the St. Petersburg Academy of Sciences. He had also served as the rector of the Kiev University and the Finance minister.

Biography
Bunge was born to Christian Gottlieb von Bunge from the Lutheran Bunge family of East Prussian origin, in Kiev and was second generation of Kievan. His grandfather, Georg Friedrich Bunge moved from the Stallupönen to Kiev sometime in the 18th century. Bunge was a professor of the Kiev University, of which he served as a dean between 1859 and 1880, when he was summoned to St. Petersburg to become a deputy minister and then (since 1881) Minister of Finance. Five years later, he became Chairman of the Cabinet of Ministers, the highest position in the civil administration of the Russian Empire.

Bunge undertook a number of reforms with the aim of modernizing the Russian economy. He consolidated the banking system of the Empire and founded the Peasants' Land Bank (1883) which helped peasants to purchase land. He introduced important tax law changes which seriously reduced the tax burden of the peasantry. The head tax was abolished and the inheritance tax was introduced.

Bunge's policies towards the Russian industries were extremely protectionist. He promoted the construction of railways and spearheaded the first Russian labour laws, some of them aimed at reducing child labour.

However, in 1887 under pressure of conservative deputies, accusing him of incompetence and incapability to overcome the budgeted deficit, N.K. Bunge resigned.

References

1823 births
1895 deaths
People from Kievsky Uyezd
People from the Russian Empire of German descent
Heads of government of the Russian Empire
Finance ministers of Russia
Government ministers of Russia
Members of the State Council (Russian Empire)
Economists from the Russian Empire
Taras Shevchenko National University of Kyiv alumni
Full members of the Saint Petersburg Academy of Sciences
Honorary members of the Saint Petersburg Academy of Sciences
Rectors of Taras Shevchenko National University of Kyiv
Recipients of the Order of St. Vladimir, 1st class